Trimble is a surname of English origin.  Notable people with the name include:

 Allen Trimble, Governor of Ohio, 1822 & 1826–1830
 Angela Trimble, birthname of the singer Debbie Harry
 Andrew Trimble, Irish rugby footballer
 Barbara Margaret Trimble, British crime/thriller writer
 Bjo Trimble, science fiction writer
 Bobb Trimble, folk musician
 Carey A. Trimble, Hawaii politician
 David Trimble (1944–2022), Northern Irish politician, Conservative Party
 David Trimble (congressman)
 Deja Trimble, American rapper, singer and songwriter
 Frederick H. Trimble, American architect 
 Gail Trimble, captain of the 2009 University Challenge champions from Corpus Christi College, Oxford
 Glenn Trimble, Australian cricketer
 Gordon Trimble, American politician
 Isaac Ridgeway Trimble, Confederate General in the Civil War
 James Trimble (disambiguation):
 James William Trimble, U.S. Representative from Arkansas
 James W. Trimble (football coach), American college football coach
 James Trimble (Canadian politician), Speaker of the British Columbia legislature
 Jerry Trimble, American actor and martial artist
 Jim Trimble, American football coach
 Joan Trimble (1915–2000), Irish composer and pianist
 Joe Trimble, baseball pitcher
 John Trimble (theologian), cofounder of the Grange farmers movement in the USA
 John Trimble (politician), U.S. Representative from Tennessee
 Kenny Trimble, American musician
 Laurence Trimble, silent movie star, writer, and director
 Lawrence S. Trimble (1825–1904), U.S. Representative from Kentucky
 Lester Trimble, American music critic and composer
 Louis Trimble, American writer
 Marcia Trimble (1965–1975), American murder victim
 Melo Trimble (born 1995), American basketball player
 Robert Trimble, Associate Justice, U.S. Supreme Court, 1826–1828
 Ross Trimble (1902–1950), Canadian football player and coach
 Sam Trimble, Australian cricketer
 Violet Trimble, fictional character in Drive (TV series)
 Valerie Trimble (1917–1980), Irish pianist and sister of Joan Trimble
 Vance Trimble (1913–2021), American journalist and writer
 Virginia Trimble, American astronomer
 Vivian Trimble, American musician
 Wayne Trimble, American football player
 William A. Trimble, U.S. Senator from Ohio

Surnames of English origin